PNS Tariq may refer to one of the following ships of the Pakistan Navy:

 , the former British O-class destroyer HMS Offa (G29); acquired by the Pakistan Navy in 1949; scrapped in 1959
 , the former American  USS Wiltsie (DD-716) launched in 1945; acquired by the Pakistan Navy in 1977; renamed Nazim in 1990
 , the former British Type 21 frigate HMS Ambuscade (F172); acquired by the Pakistan Navy in 1993
PNS Tariq（F282）, a Babur Class Corvette

Pakistan Navy ship names